is a railway station located in 4-Jōdōri 18-chōme, Asahikawa, Hokkaidō, on the Sōya Main Line, and is operated by the Hokkaido Railway Company (JR Hokkaidō).

Lines
JR Hokkaidō
Sōya Main Line
Sekihoku Main Line (The starting point is at Shin-Asahikawa Station, but all local trains originate and terminate at Asahikawa Station.)

Adjacent stations

References

External links

Ekikara Timetable - Asahikawa Yojō Station 

Railway stations in Hokkaido Prefecture
Railway stations in Japan opened in 1957
Buildings and structures in Asahikawa